Pleasant Lake is a small private lake located in Stratford, Fulton County, New York in the southern Adirondack Park.

References 

Lakes of New York (state)
Lakes of Fulton County, New York